Shenlong, (literally "god dragon" or "divine dragon", Japanese: 神竜 Shinryū) is a spiritual dragon from Chinese mythology who is the master of storms and also a bringer of rain. He is of equal significance to other creatures such as Tianlong, the celestial dragon.

The spiritual dragons are azure-scaled and govern the wind, clouds and rain, on which all agricultural life depends. Chinese people would take great care to avoid offending them, for if they grew angry or felt neglected, the result was bad weather, drought, flood or thunderstorms.

Despite this, Shenlong appears to signify a special rank in the splendid robes and regalia of Chinese emperors. He was also five-clawed, which was iconic of the imperial dragon. Chinese empires have admired shenlong for centuries through festivals.

In popular culture
The anime and manga franchise Dragon Ball features a wish-fulfilling dragon named Shenlong (renamed in the English dubbed versions as Shenron).
Shenlong is the name of one of the five Gundanium mobile suits in the anime series Mobile Suit Gundam Wing.
Shenlong is also the name of the IS (Infinite Stratos), a 3rd generation, close combat prototype that belongs to Lingyin Huang in the popular light novel series Infinite Stratos.
There is a dragon named Shenlong in the television series Sagwa, the Chinese Siamese Cat.
In the table top miniwargame Malifaux, in the Ten Thunders faction, there is a Master named Shenlong, who was possessed by "The Dragon".

References

Sources 
Karl Shuker: Dragons. A Natural History. Simon & Schuster, New York 1995, p. 89

Chinese dragons

fr:Dragon oriental#Variétés
ja:神龍
pl:Smok chiński#Rodzaje smoków